This article details the Wigan Warriors rugby league football club's 2016 season. This is the Warriors 21st season in the Super League.

World Club Series

Super League

Regular season

Matches

Table

 *Salford were penalized six points for a salary cap infringement during the 2014 and 2015 seasons.

Q = Qualified for Super 8s

F = Failed to qualify for the Super 8s

Super 8's

Matches

Table

(C) = Champions

(L) = League Leaders

(Q) = Qualified for playoffs

(U) = Unable to qualify for playoffs

Play-offs

Player appearances

 = Injured

 = Suspended

Challenge Cup

Player appearances

Squad Statistics

 Appearances and points include (Super League, Challenge Cup and Play-offs) as of 21 April 2016.

 = Injured
 = Suspended

Transfers

In

Out

References

External links
Wigan Warriors Website
Wigan Warriors - SL Website

Wigan Warriors seasons
Super League XXI by club